Greatest Hits is a compilation album from Canadian singer and guitarist Kim Mitchell. The album was released in 1995. The opening and closing tracks, "Transcendental Soda" and "Hare Soda", are instrumental intro and outro pieces, recorded live, with Mitchell playing the "Go for Soda" riff and the crowd responding.

Track listings

Canadian Version
All songs by Kim Mitchell and Pye Dubois, except where indicated
 "Transcendental Soda" – 0:46
 "Rock N Roll Duty" – 3:42 
 "That's the Hold" – 3:59
 "Go for Soda" – 3:25
 "No More Walking Away" – 4:14 (new song)
 "Lager & Ale" – 3:15 (new recording)  
 "Rocklandwonderland" – 4:27
 "Easy to Tame" – 4:13
 "Rainbow" (Mitchell, Andy Curran) – 4:15 (new song)  
 "All We Are" – 5:42
 "Patio Lanterns" – 3:58 (new recording)  
 "Acrimony" – 3:55
 "America" (Mitchell, Jim Chevalier) – 4:42 
 "Expedition Sailor" (The Other Version) – 4:28
 "Lemon Wedge" – 5:33 
 "I Am a Wild Party" (live) – 4:26
 "Hare Soda" – 1:05

US Version
 "Transcendental Soda" – 0:46
 "Rock N Roll Duty" – 3:42 
 "That's the Hold" – 3:59
 "Go for Soda" – 3:25
 "No More Walking Away" – 4:14 (new song)
 "Lager & Ale" – 3:15 (new recording)  
 "Rocklandwonderland" – 4:27
 "Easy to Tame" – 4:13
 "Rainbow" – 4:15 (new song)  
 "All We Are" – 5:42
 "Patio Lanterns" – 3:58 (new recording)  
 "Acrimony" – 3:55
 "World's Such a Wonder"  (Mitchell, Chevalier) – 4:56
 "Expedition Sailor" (The Other Version) – 4:28
 "Battle Scar" (live) – 5:33
 "I Am a Wild Party" (live) – 4:26
 "Hare Soda" – 1:05

Personnel (new recordings)
Mark Peters, Leanne Poole, Bob Shindle – engineers
Rick Chycki – mixing
George Graves, Scott Murley – remastering

References

Resources
http://www.kimmitchell.ca

1995 greatest hits albums
Kim Mitchell albums
Alert Records albums
Albums recorded at Metalworks Studios